James Byers was a New York shipowner, merchant and sealer, originally from Springfield, Massachusetts.

Byers sent a four-vessel sealing fleet to the South Shetland Islands in 1820-21.  He also lobbied US Secretary of State John Quincy Adams and President James Monroe to send a warship and take possession of the islands, suggesting that the American sealers were prepared to establish a permanent settlement there.

Honour
Byers Peninsula on Livingston Island in the South Shetland Islands is named after James Byers.

References
 Alan Gurney, Below the Convergence: Voyages Toward Antarctica, 1699-1839, Penguin Books, New York, 1998

Notes

Year of birth missing
Year of death missing
American merchants
Sealers